Jaloliddin Balkhi District (2007-2016 Rumi District, before 2007 Kolkhozobod District, in 1933 Vakhsh district,  1934 — 1957 Kaganovichabad, before 1933 Tughalang and Halovard), is a district in Khatlon Region, Tajikistan, located south of the regional capital Kurgan-Tyube (Qurghonteppa) and Vakhsh District. It was renamed Rumi District on 23 June 2007 in commemoration of the 800th anniversary of the Persian poet and philosopher Rumi and plans were announced to erect a monument to Rumi in the district. It was renamed again in 2016 to Jaloliddin Balkhi, another name for the poet Rumi.

The population of Jaloliddin Balkhi District is 201,300 (January 2020 estimate). The district capital is Balkh (former name: Kolkhozobod). The district has an area of about 900 km2.

Administrative divisions
The district is divided administratively into two towns and six jamoats. They are as follows:

References

External links

Districts of Khatlon Region
Districts of Tajikistan